Sung Chia-hao (born 6 September 1992) is a Taiwanese professional baseball Pitcher for the Tohoku Rakuten Golden Eagles of the Nippon Professional Baseball (NPB). He attended National Taiwan Sport University.

Career
On October 20, 2015, Sung signed with the Tohoku Rakuten Golden Eagles of the Nippon Professional Baseball(NPB).

On December 3, 2019, Sung signed a 1-year extension to remain with the Eagles.

International career
Sung represented Taiwan at the 2014 21U Baseball World Cup, 2014 Asian Games, 2015 Universiade, 2015 WBSC Premier12 2017 World Baseball Classic, and 2023 World Baseball Classic.

References

External links

1992 births
Living people
National Taiwan Normal University alumni
Nippon Professional Baseball pitchers
People from Taitung County
Taiwanese expatriate baseball players in Japan
Tohoku Rakuten Golden Eagles players
2017 World Baseball Classic players
2023 World Baseball Classic players
Asian Games medalists in baseball
Baseball players at the 2014 Asian Games
Asian Games silver medalists for Chinese Taipei
Medalists at the 2014 Asian Games
Amis people